Steve Darcis was the defending champion, but lost in the first round to Andy Roddick, who went on to win the title by defeating Radek Štěpánek in the final, 7–5, 7–5.

Seeds

Draw

Finals

Top half

Bottom half

Qualifying

Seeds

Qualifiers

Draw

First qualifier

Second qualifier

Third qualifier

Fourth qualifier

External links
Draw
Qualifying Draw

Singles